Piedade is a village on São Tomé Island in São Tomé and Príncipe. Its population is 1,408 (2012 census). It lies directly southeast of Batepá and 2 km west of Trindade. The agricultural school Centro de Aperfeiçoamento Técnico Agro-Pecuário (CATAP) is located in Piedade.

Population history

References

Populated places in Mé-Zóchi District